Ezekiel Isoken Henty (born 13 May 1993) is a Nigerian footballer who plays as a striker for Cypriot club Apollon Limassol on loan from the Slovak club Slovan Bratislava.

Club career

AC Milan
Born in Lagos, Nigeria, Henty began his career at Flying Sports before joining AC Milan on 15 September 2012, alongside Favour Aniekan and was assigned to Milan Primavera. After being assigned to Milan Primavera, Henty went on to score 10 times in 22 appearances in all competitions, including scoring two braces against Cittadella Primavera and Udinese Primavera. While at Milan Primavera, Henty began taking responsibility since moving to Europe and have since grown up.

Ahead of the 2013–14 season, Henty was told by AC Milan management that he would need to be loaned out to gain first team experience. The following month, in July, it was announced that Henty was loaned out to Serie B side Spezia for the remainder of the 2013–14 season. After starting out on the substitute bench, Henty then scored his first Spezia goal on 24 September 2013, in a 2–1 win over Ternana. However, he struggled in the first team at Spezia and returned to his parent club, with just six appearances and scoring once.

Shortly after the end of his loan spell at Spezia, Henty joined Lega Pro side Perugia on loan for the rest of the season on 9 January 2014. Henty made his Perugia debut on 12 January 2014, coming on as a late substitute, in a 5–0 win over AS Gubbio. It wasn't until on 24 January 2014 when he scored again, in a 3–2 win over Grosseto. Although his playing time was reduced towards the end of the season, Henty played a role in the play-offs against Virtus Entella when he scored in a 3–1 win to help the club gain promotion to Serie B. At his time at Perugia, Henty went on to score 2 times in twelve appearances.
 
In the summer of 2014, Henty was linked around Europe with a move to Sivasspor and Vitória. Instead, Henty opted to join Slovenian side Gorica on loan on 29 August 2014. Two days later, on 31 August 2014, he made his Gorica debut, coming on as a second-half substitute, in a 2–1 loss against Rudar Velenje. It wasn't until on 29 September 2014 when he scored his first goal for the club, in a 2–1 win over Krka. He then scored again on 19 October 2014, in a 3–0 win over Radomlje. However, he found himself on the sidelines when he suffered an injury in late October. Despite this, Henty went on to score two times in thirteen appearances for the side.

Olimpija Ljubljana

It was announced on 31 January 2015 that Henty joined Olimpija Ljubljana on loan for the rest of the season. It came after when he went on a trial at the club and his loan spell at Gorica ended. It was previously hinted that Henty was on a move to Turkey before joining Olimpija Ljubija. He made his Olimpija Ljubljana debut on 28 February 2015, in a 4–0 win over Radomlje. It wasn't until on 14 March 2015 when he scored his first goal for the club, in a 3–1 win over Gorica. Henty scored again on 4 April 2015, in a 3–1 win over Zavrč. After adding two more goals, he went on to finish the season, making 14 appearances and scoring 4 times.

In the summer transfer of 2015, Henty joined Olimpija Ljubljana on a permanent for a transfer fee of €150,000, signing a two-year contract. He then scored his first goals since joining the club, in a 4–1 win over Koper on 12 August 2015, followed up by scoring another brace in a 3–0 win over Maribor four days later. In a 5–0 win over Krško on 4 October 2015, Henty set up two goals, which was then followed up by scoring a brace, in a 2–1 win over Koper. After missing out for one match, he scored again on 2 December 2015, in a 2–1 win over Zavrč.

After making 22 appearances and scoring 9 times for the side, Henty was linked a move away from Olimpija Ljubljana in the January transfer window. As a result, the club began a contract negotiations with Henty, which they claimed the agreement is made in December 2015. Henty, himself, wanted to stay at the club to help the club win the league. However, the club accepted a bid from two Russian teams for €5.5 million, which is believed to be a record-breaking transfer for the club. After the move, Henty reflected on his departure, stating he stand by his decision.

Lokomotiv Moscow

It was confirmed on 19 February 2016 that Henty joined Lokomotiv Moscow for €5.5 million, confirming a record-breaking transfer. Upon joining the club, Henty was given number 45 shirt instead of 10 shirt, which he initially opted for.

Henty made his Lokomotiv Moscow debut on 6 March 2016, where he came on as a second-half substitute, in a 2–1 loss against Terek Grozny. After making his debut for the club, Henty said his target was to score 7–8 goals in ten matches. However, his time at Lokomotiv Moscow throughout the rest of the season was a disappointment, due to his failure to score goals as he did at Olimpija Ljubljana earlier this season despite being given more time to adapt at Russia. Despite making 10 appearances at the end of the 2015–16 season, Henty managed to redeem himself when he set up a goal for Petar Škuletić, in a 3–0 win over Mordovia Saransk in the last game of the season.

In the 2016–17 season, Henty continued to feature in the first team despite being on the substitute bench at the start of the season. He then scored his first goal for the club, in a 2–1 win over Krasnodar on 28 August 2016. However, Henty continued to struggled in the first team and scoring goals, due to competitions from Aleksei Miranchuk and Maicon Marques. As a result, he was expected to leave the club in January over poor performance and his first team opportunities had become difficult for him to come by.

Baniyas SC (loan)
It was announced on 16 January 2017 that Henty would be loaned out to UAE Arabian Gulf League side Baniyas for the rest of the season. The move also included an option to sign Henty on a permanent basis.

Henty made his Baniyas SC debut five days later on 21 January 2017 after signing for the club, starting the whole game, in a 4–3 loss against Dibba Al-Fujairah. It wasn't until on 3 March 2017 when he scored his first goal for the club, as well as, setting another goal, in a 4–3 loss against Al-Wasl. Six days later, on 9 March 2017, Henty scored twice, in a 6–2 loss against Al Wahda. After adding two more goals, the club was unsuccessful to survive in the league.

At the end of the 2016–17 season, making 12 appearances and scoring five times for the side, Henty returned to his parent club.

Videoton

It was reported on 19 July 2017 that Henty moved to Hungarian side Videoton, signing a three-year contract. The fee was reported to be €1 million.

Henty made his Videoton debut on 30 July 2017, starting the whole game, in a 2–2 draw against Újpest. He then scored his first goal for the club in a follow up match on 6 August 2017, in a 2–0 win over Mezőkövesdi. Since joining the club, Henty quickly became the club's fan favourite, where he gave a shirt to a fan after the match. Between 21 October 2017 and 4 November 2017, he scored three goals in three matches against Puskás Akadémia, Újpest (in which he scored just 25 seconds into the match) and Mezőkövesdi. After the match against Újpest, Henty was subjected of racism from Újpest supporters following the end of the match. As a result, Újpest was fined for their role of racially abuse Henty.

Slovan Bratislava
On 24 January 2020, it was announced that Henty had reached an agreement on a permanent transfer with reigning Slovak champions, Slovan Bratislava. His transfer was understood as a replacement for departing Andraž Šporar, who had left for Sporting CP earlier.

On 11 August 2022, Henty joined Apollon Limassol in Cyprus on a season-long loan with an option to buy.

Club statistics

Personal life
Growing up, Henty said he idolised George Weah. Henty revealed that he wasn't interested in football at first, preferring to focus on his education. This all changed when his mother, who is a football fan, convinced him to play football, having bought him footwear and equipment, which changed his passion.

Henty speaks English, Italian, and some Russian. He has also revealed that he would accept a Slovenian citizenship if he was offered.

Honours
Slovan Bratislava
Fortuna Liga (2): 2019–20, 2020–21
Slovnaft Cup (2): 2019–20, 2020–21

References

External links
PrvaLiga profile 

1993 births
Sportspeople from Lagos
Living people
Nigerian footballers
Association football forwards
A.C. Milan players
Spezia Calcio players
A.C. Perugia Calcio players
ND Gorica players
NK Olimpija Ljubljana (2005) players
FC Lokomotiv Moscow players
Baniyas Club players
Fehérvár FC players
Puskás Akadémia FC players
NK Osijek players
ŠK Slovan Bratislava players
Al-Hazem F.C. players
Apollon Limassol FC players
Serie B players
Serie C players
Slovenian PrvaLiga players
Russian Premier League players
UAE Pro League players
Nemzeti Bajnokság I players
Croatian Football League players
Slovak Super Liga players
Saudi Professional League players
Cypriot First Division players
Nigerian expatriate footballers
Expatriate footballers in Italy
Nigerian expatriate sportspeople in Italy
Nigerian expatriate sportspeople in Slovenia
Expatriate footballers in Slovenia
Nigerian expatriate sportspeople in Russia
Expatriate footballers in Russia
Nigerian expatriate sportspeople in the United Arab Emirates
Expatriate footballers in the United Arab Emirates
Nigerian expatriate sportspeople in Hungary
Expatriate footballers in Hungary
Nigerian expatriate sportspeople in Croatia
Expatriate footballers in Croatia
Nigerian expatriate sportspeople in Slovakia
Expatriate footballers in Slovakia
Nigerian expatriate sportspeople in Saudi Arabia
Expatriate footballers in Saudi Arabia
Nigerian expatriate sportspeople in Cyprus
Expatriate footballers in Cyprus